The 1995 British motorcycle Grand Prix was the ninth round of the 1995 Grand Prix motorcycle racing season. It took place on 23 July 1995 at the Donington Park circuit.

500 cc classification

250 cc classification

125 cc classification

References

British motorcycle Grand Prix
British
Motorcycle Grand Prix
British Grand Prix